Piz Val Nera (or Monte Val Nera) is a mountain of the Livigno Alps, located between the Italian region of Lombardy and the Swiss canton of Graubünden. Its summit is 3,188 metre-high and lies within Italy, 200 metres north of the border with Switzerland (3,160 m).

References

External links
 
 Piz Val Nera on Hikr

Mountains of the Alps
Mountains of Lombardy
Mountains partially in Switzerland